Munduz is a village in the Jalal-Abad Region of Kyrgyzstan. It is part of the Aksy District. Its population was 1,285 in 2021.

References
 

Populated places in Jalal-Abad Region